Welnetham railway station was on the Long Melford-Bury St Edmunds branch line, serving Great Whelnetham, Little Whelnetham and Sicklesmere in Suffolk. It opened in 1865 and closed in 1961; later it was converted into a private residence.

The "Welnetham" station sign is on display at the National Railway Museum in York.

References

External links
 Welnetham station on navigable 1946 O. S. map
 

Disused railway stations in Suffolk
Former Great Eastern Railway stations
Railway stations in Great Britain opened in 1865
Railway stations in Great Britain closed in 1961